Muagututia is a surname. Notable people with the surname include:

Halakilangi Muagututia (born 1978), American football player
Richard Muagututia (born 1988), Samoan rugby union player

Samoan-language surnames